Sacha Gros (born November 27, 1974, in Glenwood Springs, Colorado) is an American former alpine skier who competed in the 1998 Winter Olympics.

References

1974 births
Living people
American male alpine skiers
Olympic alpine skiers of the United States
Alpine skiers at the 1998 Winter Olympics
People from Glenwood Springs, Colorado